Port Isabel may refer to:
Port Isabel, Texas, a city in Cameron County, Texas, United States
Port Isabel, Sonora, a former port (1864-1879) at the mouth of the Colorado River in Sonora, Mexico